Michael Bielicky (born 12 January 1954 in Prague) is a Czech-German artist working in new media, video art, and installations. He is a professor in the department of digital media and post-digital narratives at the Karlsruhe University of Arts and Design. In 1989, Bielicky's artwork Menora/Inventur became the first work to be acquired by the ZKM Center for Art and Media Karlsruhe by its founder Heinrich Klotz.

Early life 
Michael Bielicky spent his childhood in Czechoslovakia and emigrated with his parents to Düsseldorf, Germany in 1969. He studied medicine from 1975 to 1978. He lived in New York from 1980 to 1981 and experimented with photography there. Michael Bielicky returned to Germany in 1981 and worked for Monochrome Magazine from 1981 to 1989. He studied at the Kunstakademie Düsseldorf from 1984 to 1989, initially with Bernd Becher, and soon changed disciplines to study with Nam June Paik. He graduated in 1989 and worked as Paik's assistant until 1991.

Life 
 Bielicky was appointed professor of the Ateliér nových médií (New Media Department) at the Akademie výtvarných umění v Praze (AVU, Visual Arts University, Prague) in 1991 and remained until 2006. At the same time, he worked with the Goethe Institute Prague and organized several symposia since 1991 about Vilém Flusser who was also born in Prague, the philosopher, and communication scientist, whom he also commemorates in the experimental documentary film Flussers Fluss (1990) shortly before Vilém's death in 1991. Since 1991 he heads established various Media Art departments throughout Eastern Europe as a Soros Center for the Arts (SCCA) representative.

From 1995 to 1996 he was a scientific consultant for culture and technology for the Council of Europe in Strasbourg and subsequently in 1996 assigned co-founder of Unstable Thoughts in Kyiv, Ukraine. In 1997 Bielicky cooperated with the High Tech Center Babelsberg in Potsdam. In the mid-1990s he began developing interactive installations and performances, then in 1999-2000 researched a prototype of an interactive 360° environment (Delvaux's Dream) at the Centre for Art and Media Technology (ZKM).

From 1999 to 2001 he developed the Virtual Set Project at ZKM with Room With A View being an associated artwork. Since 2002 he has been involved in the establishment of the first New Media Department at Chiang Mai University in Northern Thailand.

Michael Bielicky has been appointed Professor of Digital Media at the Staatliche Hochschule für Gestaltung Karlsruhe since 2006 and increasingly cooperates with Kamila B. Richter. From this cooperation stem four technically linked groups of works: the Falling-group (2005-2010), the Columbus-2.0- (2008-2011) and Data Dybukk-group (2015-2018). The first two groups are based on a custom-made Flash-programming environment and editor, and the latter two are based on a custom-made Java-programming environment and editor.

The newest work Narcissistic Machine (2018) is the initial work of a new group of works and marks a new technical, as well as aesthetical programming onset.

Works: In Between Video and Media Installations 

Produced in 1986, Perpetuum Mobile was one of Michael Bielicky's first video works produced in Düsseldorf. Bielicky tried to reinvent his artistic practice along major technical cornerstones, starting with Stop Motion, via U-Matic, Time base correction with DOC (Drop-out compensator) to GPS, the Internet, and real-time data and provoked and documented the aesthetic errors of the specter in the machine, in parallel and in contradiction to the ongoing technical refinement process of the media industry. 

In the 1980s he developed unintended techniques with the first digital video editing machines to alter, distort and rearrange his video material, akin to his mentor Nam June Paik's debut exhibition in 1963, where Paik used magnets to distort his own television-set-based exhibits. Works like Four Seasons (1984), Circulus Vicious (1985), and Paik-Hat (1986) are disturbing linear narrative traditions through cutting techniques and stop motion alone, whereas Perpetuum Mobile (1986), Next Year in Jerusalem (1988) and Golem is Alive (1989) introduce digital editing techniques to create videos, that appear to be haunted by the specters of early East European media culture. 
In 1989, the same year Golem is Alive is released, Michael Bielicky expands the two-dimensional screen into the exhibition space. With his Menorah/Inventur (1989) he does away with the screen frames with the intent to dissolve those in a symbolically powerful sculpture, one of the main symbols of the Jewish religion. One year later, in 1990, he does away with the religious symbolism and houses his videos in the most universal scientific and technical symbol, the spiral:

"One can walk through the spiral-like tunnel. At the end of that tunnel is a black sphere (somewhere). A small TV transmitter transmits the information (in the form of a flame) to the carrier, the spiral, and the receivers (TVs). Information always moves through time and space in the same form. It always has the form of a spiral. The sounds of human language move through space in the same way as our solar system moves through the universe. We store information on a computer disc in a spiral form, as we do on a videotape.

The Name (1990), which is technically akin to Menorah/Inventur (the small televisions are receivers for a video source nearby, fire and screens are intertwined as a symbol of and a means of communication), is the attempt to balance technical expertise and historic cultural mystery in one work of art. Bielicky tries to unmask technology as one Metanarrative among many.

In 1987 Bielicky examined the destruction of Joseph Beuys's Fettecke (Fat Corner) in collaboration with Ricardo Peredo Wende. The resulting documentary video sculpture is a who is who of Beuys's students and disciples, as well as a cascade of partly absurd, partly fascinating explanations, of why and how this case of a janitor's utter ignorance of art has implications for the future of art as a whole.

 A technologically pioneering project, Bielicky sets out to inscribe the biblical Exodus route into the prototype of what we all have come to know as the internet. Calling it a tele-performance in 1995, Bielicky and al. - equipped with a Jeep stacked with what was high-end technology in 1995 - set out to track the Exodus route in the Negev desert, collecting GPS data and storing it on one of the first websites as they go. That project, at the very junction of religion and narrative technology, marks a turning point in Bielicky's work. Technology is not mystified by specters anymore, the equilibrium reached with The Name (1990) tips in favor of technology: Bielicky literally traces the biblical history of Jewish culture scientifically.

In 1994 he begins to experiment with GPS in an art context: his work Intelligent Mailman (1994) is the first of its kind worldwide and marks the onset of numerous foundational research projects on interactive media art (see: Works: Proceedings and Foundations).

Since 2005 - in cooperation with Kamila B. Richter - Bielicky develops web-based, often interactive projects, controlled by real-time data fed from the Internet. Market and stock exchange data, news, Twitter, and other data streams guide their animated stories - often in an uncanny and counterintuitive way. This workshop series can be described by four major setups: The earliest two web-based projects with Kamila B. Richter are Columbus 2.0 and Falling Life/Times (with a predecessor called Falling Stars). Columbus 2.0 was displayed in Wuhan (2007), Sevilla (2008), and Thessaloniki (2011), whereas Falling Life/Times was displayed in Barcelona (2007), São Paulo (2008), and New York (2008).

The more complex, later two web-based projects with Kamila B. Richter is The Garden of Error and Decay and the Why Don't We series. The Garden of Error and Decay series takes the text-to-pictogram-converter-algorithms of Falling Times and accompanies its generated pictograms with the texts that generated them on screen - in a Garden Eden kind of backdrop. Adding the wave-animations of Columbus 2.0 and its interactive approach, the Garden of Error and Decay series engulfs the exhibition visitor in an information environment occupied by skeletons, warlords, and explosions, with the option to stop ("shoot") a pictogram with the joystick mounted in front of the projection: a desperate attempt to lessen its impact on the world of information (it is displayed smaller if successfully hit). Nevertheless, there is a meta-information feed overriding all the mentioned interaction and aggregation algorithms at work. This meta-information feed is that of the NY stock exchange and influences the dimensions the messages and pictograms are displayed in a far greater way, to a point where the interaction of the visitor does not count at all. The Garden of Error and Decay was displayed in Wuhan (2009), Moscow (2011), Vienna (2011), Vienna (2012), Seoul (2013), and Karlsruhe (2013).

The Why Don't We series takes a slightly different approach to web-influenced narratives. The narrative is not endless and pluralistic, displaying many social media messages in parallel, but picks one message, displays it for the visitor to see, and tells a short story in automatically generated pictograms until the next digital (news) text is displayed and the next narrative is visualized. Why Don't We were displayed in Vienna (2013), Berlin (2013), and Bad Rothenfelde (2014, 2017).

In 2015 Michael Bielicky and Kamila B. Richter used their narration algorithms to project a self-similar, compartmentalized, endless, dense, and orchestra-controlled narrative of pictograms which not only uncannily felt at home on the scanaefrons, behind the theatre stage, but even were the only protagonist and pivotal part of the piece. Appropriately called Lost Objects the Opera was displayed at the National Theatre Prague.

Recently Michael Bielicky and Kamila B. Richter increasingly follow invitations to provide solo exhibitions and bring their series together in multitudes of walls and spaces. Stemming from the Lost Objects experience in the Opera House, all four series are brought together in a self-similar, compartmentalized, endless, dense, and visitor-controlled manner. Here not the pictograms and their intricate interaction are the main protagonists, but the wandering visitors, who stride through the cut-up, translucent, and three-dimensionally hung projection canvases, over and over covered with pictograms and texts and become pictograms themselves. Michael Bielicky and Kamila B. Richter had solo exhibits at Strasbourg (2016) and Havana (2017).

Works: Proceedings and Foundations 

Bielicky returns to Prague from 1991 to 2006 to found the School of Media Arts at the Academy of Fine Arts (AVU).  In addition to his AVU position, he works closely with the Goethe Institute Prague and – beginning in the early 1990s - organizes several symposia in honor of the famous, also Prague-born philosopher and photography theoretician Vilém Flusser. He has been an advisor in culture and technology to the Soros Centre for Contemporary Art through Eastern Europe from Bucharest, Odessa, and Moscow to Alma-Ata in Kazakhstan, to the Council of Europe in Strasbourg, and to Chiang Mai University in Thailand where he is involved in establishing a new Media Arts Department. From the mid-1990s on, Bielicky leads foundational research programs at the ZKM Centre for Art and Media in Karlsruhe: an interactive 360° environment, named Delvaux's Dream (1998–99), and a project for Volkswagen in the Autostadt Wolfsburg named Room with a View (2000). In 1996 he has been the co-founder of the Institute of Unstable Thoughts in Kyiv, Ukraine. Michael Bielicky cooperates with the High Tech Centre Babelsberg in Potsdam in 1997. From 1999 to 2000 Bielicky establishes a research program on interactive 360° environment prototypes at the ZKM Centre for Art and Media in Karlsruhe, as well as - from 1999 to 2001 - the Virtual Set Project, which builds on the former.

Since 2006 Michael Bielicky is the Professor of New Media at the Karlsruhe University of Arts and Design.

Exhibitions 

Bielicky's first exhibition was held in 1988 at the Cité internationale des arts in Paris, in the grand glass front gallery reserved for scholars on the second floor. The first major retrospective of his works in collaboration with Kamila B. Richter was held at the Centro de Arte Contemporáneo Wifredo Lam in Havana, Cuba. The first major retrospective of his work is organized by the Centre of Media and Arts (ZKM) Karlsruhe and opens on 13 October 2019. It is scheduled to run until 8 March 2020.

In 1991, an exhibition centered on Bielicky's video sculpture The Name (1990) opened at the Montevideo Gallery in Amsterdam, Netherlands.

Bielicky's work also appeared in group exhibitions such as São Paulo Biennale (1987), Videonale (1988, 1990, 1992), Multimediale 2 (1991), Ars Electronica (1992, 1994, 1995), Global Contemporary (2011), Havana Biennale (2012) and Globale (2015).

Awards and scholarships (selection) 

 1988 Honorable mention 3. Marler Video-Kunst-Preises (3rd Marler Video-Art-Prize)
 1988 scholarship for Cité Internationale des Arts de Paris, Paris
 1999–2000: Guest artist grant at the Institute for Image Media (produced@) at the ZKM Karlsruhe
 2000 Prix Ars Electronica, Honorable mention for Cyber Arts for Room With A View

Further reading 

Michael Bielicky's texts (selection)

 Michael Bielicky, Keiko Sei. Die Letzten Tage (The Last Days). In: Friedemann Malsch (Ed.). Parallele Kunst - Ein Rückblick auf die 80er Jahre. Köln, Kunstforum international, Band 117. 1992. pp. 75–76.
 Alena Kucerova, Michael Bielicky. Od Videoartu k interaktivnim umenim. (Interview). In: Alena Kucerova (Ed.). Video + Film (monthly Journal). Prague, Informacni a poradenske stredisko pro mistni kulturu. 1993.
 Michael Bielicky. Big Sleep, 1993. In: Klaus Bußmann (Ed.). Nam June Paik, eine data base: la Biennale di Venezia, XLV Esposizione Internazionale d'Arte. Stuttgart. Ed. Cantz, 1993. S. 148B. 
 Michael Bielicky. Der Weg ins Immaterielle. In: Susanne Rennert, Stephan von Wiese (Hrsg.). Students of Paik: 1978 – 95, video dreams. Düsseldorf, Kunstmuseum im Ehrenhof. 1996. S. 22ff.
 Michael Bielicky. Time-Space-Nothing. In: Susanne Rennert, Stephan von Wiese (Hrsg.). Students of Paik: 1978 – 95, video dreams. Düsseldorf, Kunstmuseum im Ehrenhof. 1996. S. 22ff.
 Michael Bielicky. On Spaceless Space. In: Raymond Weber, Vaclav Havel (Eds.). Conference on A New Space for Culture and Society: 19. – 23- November 1996. Council of Europe,  Strasbourg. 1996. p. 16.	
 Michael Bielicky. Hypertext. In: Olga Shishko, Irina Alpatova (Eds.). NewMediaLogia - NewMediaTopia (lecture series). Moskau, Soros Center for Contemporary Arts. 1996. pp. 171ff.
 Michael Bielicky. Die Fotografie hat längst ihre Zweidimensionalität verloren. In: Tamara Horakova, Ewald Maurer, Johanna Hofleitner, Ruth Maurer-Horak (Eds.). Image: /images: Positionen zur zeitgenössischen Fotografie. Wien, Passagen Verlag. 2002. pp. 277ff. 
 Michael Bielicky. Unsere „zionistischen Ideen". In: Signe Rossbach (Ed.). So einfach war das: jüdische Kindheiten und Jugend seit 1945 in Österreich, der Schweiz und Deutschland; eine Ausstellung des Jüdischen Museums Hohenems in Zusammenarbeit mit dem Jüdischen Museum Berlin. Hohenems, Jüdisches Museum. 2002. pp. 22–24. .
 Michael Bielicky: Nam June Paik In-Between. In: Nam June Paik & Media Art: Proceedings of MAC2002. Seoul, Yonsei University. 2002. pp. 65–67.
 Michael Bielicky. Obrazy ztratily dvourozmernost (The Images lost their Two-Dimensionality). In: Sebastian Pawlowski (Ed.). Tyden – Komunisti mezi námi (Journal). Prag, Mediacop s.r.p.. 9/2003.
 Michael Bielicky. Prague - A Place of Illusionists. In: Jeffrey Shaw, Peter Weibel (Eds.). Future cinema: the cinematic imaginary after the film. Cambridge, MIT Press. 2003. pp. 96–101.
 Michael Bielicky. Media Golem: Between Prague and ZKM. In: Mel Alexenberg (Ed.). Educating Artists for the Future: Learning at the Intersections of Art, Science, Technology and Culture. University of Chicago Press. 2008 pp. 193ff., p. 238. 
 Michael Bielicky. Praga Magica. In: Jens Lutz, Miriam Stürner, Daria Mille-Rassokhina, Judith Bihr, Anett Holzheid (Eds.). Art in Europe 1945 - 1968: the Continent that the EU does not know. Supplement to the exhibition catalog. Karlsruhe, ZKM. 2016. pp. 29–31.
 Michael Bielicky, Clemens Jahn, Matteo Pasquinelli. Die Identitätsfrage: Künstler/in oder Theoretiker/in? – Ein Gespräch. In: Clemens Jahn (Ed.). Jahresbericht der Staatlichen Hochschule für Gestaltung Karlsruhe 2015-2016/The Karlsruhe University of Arts and Design Annual Report 2015–2016. Karlsruhe, Staatliche Hochschule für Gestaltung. 2017. pp. 157–172. 

Interviews (selection)

 Lubor Benda, Michael Bielicky. Mezi Botticellim A Teslou (In between Botticelli and Tesla, Interview). In: Dalibor Kubik, Ivan Adamovic (Eds.). Zivel Cislo 9 (Journal). Prag, IMEDIA s.r.o.. 04/1998. pp. 34–37.
 Pepe Rojo, Michael Bielicky. Movimiento Perpetuo (Perpetuum Mobile, Interview). In: Norma Lazo (Ed.) Complot 69 – Arte y Tecnología. . 10/2002.

Group and Solo Exhibition catalogs (selection)

 Axel Klepsch (Ed.), Vilém Flusser, Nam June Paik (Authors). Discover European Video: Anthology Film Archives, New York 17–25 November 1990. Düsseldorf, 1990. p. 11, 46. 
 Ginette Major (Ed.). Images du futur '91: 31 mai - 22 septembre, cité des arts et des Nouvelles technologies de Montréal. 1991. p. 18.
 Heinrich Klotz (Ed.). MultiMediale 2: Festival 28.5. - 2.6.1991. p. 44, und p. 158. 
 Sander Kollard (Ed.). Montevideo – Time-Based Arts. MonteVideo/Time Based Arts Foundation. 1992. pp. 0 ff. 
 Karl Gerbel, Peter Weibel (Eds.). Die Welt von innen, Endo & Nano (Ars Electronica 92). Linz, Veritas-Verlag. 1992. pp. 126 ff. 
 Karl Gerbel, Peter Weibel (Eds.). Intelligente Ambiente (Ars Electronica). Wien, PVS Verleger. 1994. pp. 82ff. 
 Pavel Scheufler, Raduz Cincera, Jaroslav Vancat (Eds.). The Czech Electronic Picture: The Inner Scources/Cesky Obraz Elektronicky: vnitrni zdroje. Mánes Praha. 1994.
 Karl Gerbel, Peter Weibel (Eds). Mythos Information: welcome to the wired world. Wien, New York, Springer. 1995. pp. 214ff. 
 Susanne Rennert, Stephan von Wiese (Eds.). Students of Paik: 1978 – 95, video dreams (mixed pixels). Düsseldorf, Kunstmuseum im Ehrenhof. 1996. pp. 22ff und p. 132.
 Hubertus von Amelunxen, Dieter Appelt, Peter Weibel (Eds.). Notation: Kalkül und Form in den Künsten. Karlsruhe, ZKM. 2008. p. 176. 
 Christoph Blase (Ed.). 40jahrevideokunst.de - Teil 2. Ostfildern, Hatje Cantz. 2010. pp. 86 ff, pp. 411 ff.

References

External links 

 Delvaux's Dream, 1998-99
 Crossings – The Last Path of Walter Benjamin, Berlin 2004
 Festival tschechischer Kunst und Kultur, Berlin und Karlsruhe, 2007
 Falling Times, 2007

1954 births
Living people
Czech contemporary artists